Dinualdo Destajo Gutierrez (20 February 1939 – 10 February 2019) was a Filipino prelate of the Roman Catholic Church. He was a bishop of the Diocese of Marbel who served from 1982 to 2018.

Death 
In Feb 2019, Gutierrez died from complications owing to prostate cancer and chronic obstructive pulmonary disease.

References

1939 births
2019 deaths
People from Romblon
21st-century Roman Catholic bishops in the Philippines
20th-century Roman Catholic bishops in the Philippines